The 2016 PGA EuroPro Tour, titled as the 2016 HotelPlanner.com PGA EuroPro Tour for sponsorship reasons, was the 15th season of the PGA EuroPro Tour, one of four third-tier tours recognised by the European Tour.

The schedule consisted of fifteen events, each having a minimum prize fund of £46,735, which increased depending on how many players made the cut; any unused prize money from the £50,000 maximum was added to the prize fund for the Matchroom Sport Tour Championship.

Schedule 
The following table lists official events during the 2016 season.

Order of Merit
The Order of Merit was titled as the Race to Desert Springs and was based on prize money won during the season, calculated in Pound sterling. The top five players on the tour (not otherwise exempt) earned status to play on the 2017 Challenge Tour.

Notes

References

PGA EuroPro Tour